Maar is the second studio album by Swiss post-rock band The Evpatoria Report. It was released through Get A Life! Records on 5 September 2008. The album was recorded and mixed by Serge Morattel at Rec Studio in Geneva then mixed by Glenn Miller at Greenwood Studios in Basel.

Track listing
All songs composed by The Evpatoria Report.

Personnel
The Evpatoria Report
 Laurent Quint – guitar
 Simon Robert – guitar
 David Di Lorenzo – bass
 Fabrice Berney – drums, glockenspiel
 Daniel Bacsinszky – violin, keyboard
Production
 Serge Morattel – engineering, mixing
 Glenn Miller – mastering
Additional musicians
 Stephanie Park – violin
 Tamara Elias – violin
 Jean-Baptiste Poyard – violin
 Daniel Bacsinszky – violin
 Keita Suyama – viola
 Guillaume Berney – cello
 Sylvia Minkova – double bass

References

2008 albums
The Evpatoria Report albums